HNLMS Pieter Florisz (F826) was a frigate of the . The ship was in service with the Royal Netherlands Navy from 1983 to 2001. The frigate was named after Dutch naval hero Pieter Floriszoon. The ship's radio call sign was "PADI".

Dutch service history
HNLMS Pieter Florisz was built at KM de Schelde in Vlissingen originally and to be named Willem van der Zaan. But she was renamed after the ship intended to be named Pieter Florisz was sold during construction to Greece. The keel laying took place on 21 January 1981 and the launching on 8 May 1982. The ship was put into service on 11 October 1983.

In June 1994 the ship participated in the BALTOPS 94 naval exercise with vessels from several other navies.

In 2001 the vessel was decommissioned and was sold to the Hellenic Navy.

Greek service history
The ship was transferred in 2001 to the Hellenic Navy where the ship was renamed Bouboulina using the radio call sign "SZCQ".

Notes

Kortenaer-class frigates
1982 ships
Ships built in Vlissingen
Frigates of the Cold War